Bush Elementary School may refer to the following primary schools in the United States:
 Arizona
 Barbara Bush Elementary School (Mesa) - Mesa Public Schools
 Maxine O. Bush Elementary School (Phoenix) - Roosevelt Elementary School District
 California
 George W. Bush Elementary School (Stockton) - Stockton Unified School District
 Idaho
 A. H. Bush Elementary School (Idaho Falls) - Idaho Falls School District (D91)
 Illinois
 Gordon Bush Elementary School (East St. Louis) - East St. Louis School District 189
 Kentucky
 Bush Elementary School (London) - Laurel County Public Schools
 Michigan
 W. R. Bush Elementary School (Essexville) - Essexville-Hampton Public Schools
 Missouri
 Bush Elementary School (Fulton) - Fulton 58 School District
 New York
 Clinton V. Bush Elementary School (Jamestown) - Jamestown Public Schools
 Oregon
 Asahel Bush Elementary School (Salem) - Salem-Keizer School District (24J)
 Texas
 Audrey Judy Bush Elementary School (Houston) - Alief Independent School District
 Barbara Pierce Bush Elementary School (The Woodlands) - Conroe Independent School District
 George Herbert Walker Bush Elementary School (Addison) - Dallas Independent School District
 Global Leadership Academy at Barbara Bush Elementary (Grand Prairie) - Grand Prairie Independent School District
 Barbara Pierce Bush Elementary School (Houston) - Houston Independent School District
 Laura Welch Bush Elementary School (Travis County) - Leander Independent School District
 George H. W. Bush Elementary School (Midland) - Midland Independent School District
 Laura Welch Bush Elementary School (Houston) - Pasadena Independent School District
 George W. Bush Elementary School (St. Paul) - Wylie Independent School District